The 2019 Football Championship of Rivne Oblast was won by FC Malynsk.

League table

References

Football
Rivne
Rivne